Yanovets is a rural locality (selo) in Seletskoye Rural Settlement, Suzdalsky District, Vladimir Oblast, Russia. Its population was 3 as of 2010. It has one street.

Geography 
Yanovets is on the Rpen River, 18 km southwest of Suzdal (the district's administrative centre) by road. Tarbayevo is the nearest rural locality.

References 

Rural localities in Suzdalsky District